The women's heptathlon event at the 1990 Commonwealth Games was held on 27 and 28 January at the Mount Smart Stadium in Auckland.

Results

References

Day 1 results
Day 2 results

Heptathlon
1990
1990 in women's athletics